Class 332 may refer to:

British Rail Class 332
DB Class Köf III, 332 class from 1968